is a Japanese curler and curling coach from Tokoro, Hokkaido, Japan.

He represented Japan at the 1998 Winter Olympics in Nagano, where the Japanese men's team placed 5th.

Teams and events

Record as a coach of national teams

References

External links

1978 births
Living people
Japanese male curlers
Japanese curling champions
Olympic curlers of Japan
Curlers at the 1998 Winter Olympics
Japanese curling coaches
People from Kitami, Hokkaido
Sportspeople from Hokkaido